Ragtime is a musical with music by Stephen Flaherty, lyrics by Lynn Ahrens, and a book by Terrence McNally. It is based on the 1975 novel of the same name by E.L. Doctorow.

Set in the early 20th century, Ragtime tells the story of three groups in the United States: African Americans, represented by Coalhouse Walker Jr., a Harlem musician; upper-class suburbanites, represented by Mother, the matriarch of a white upper-class family in New Rochelle, New York; and Eastern European immigrants, represented by Tateh, a Jewish immigrant from Latvia. The show also incorporates historical figures such as Harry Houdini, Evelyn Nesbit, Booker T. Washington, J. P. Morgan, Henry Ford, Stanford White, Harry Kendall Thaw, Admiral Peary, Matthew Henson, and Emma Goldman.

Production history

Original Toronto and Broadway production
The musical had its world premiere in Toronto, where it opened at the then-called Ford Centre for the Performing Arts (now the Meridian Arts Centre) on December 8, 1996 and ran for 9 months.  It was produced by Canadian impresario Garth Drabinsky and his Livent Inc., the Toronto-production company he headed.

The US premiere was at the Shubert Theatre, Los Angeles in June 1997.

The Broadway production began previews on December 26, 1997 and officially opened on January 18, 1998. It was the first production in the newly opened Ford Center for the Performing Arts. Directed by Frank Galati and choreographed by Graciela Daniele, Ragtime closed on January 16, 2000 after 834 performances and 27 previews.  The original cast featured many of the actors from the original Toronto production, including Brian Stokes Mitchell as Coal House Walker, Marin Mazzie as Mother, Peter Friedman as Tateh and Audra McDonald as Sarah, all of whom were nominated for Tony Awards, as well as Steven Sutcliffe as Mother's Younger Brother, Judy Kaye as Emma Goldman, Mark Jacoby as Father and Lea Michele as Tateh's Daughter. The production was conducted by David Loud.

The production received mixed reviews, with critics noting that the dazzling physical production (with a $10 million budget, including fireworks and a working Model T automobile) overshadowed problems in the script. Ben Brantley's review in The New York Times was headlined "A diorama with nostalgia rampant." It led the 1998 Tony Awards with thirteen Tony Award nominations, but Disney's The Lion King won as Best Musical. The musical won awards for Best Featured Actress (McDonald), Original Score, Book, and Orchestrations.  According to The New York Times, "The chief competition for The Lion King was Ragtime, a lavish musical." The New York Times also noted that "The season was an artistic success as well, creating one of the most competitive Tony contests in years, with a battle in almost every category capped by the titanic struggle for the best musical award between Ragtime with 13 nominations and The Lion King with 11." The Broadway production was not financially successful, and some Broadway insiders consider its lavish production to have been the financial "undoing" of Livent.

Virtual reunion
On March 26, 2021, cast and crew members of the original Broadway production reunited for a livestream on the web series Stars in the House. Composers Lynn Ahrens and Stephen Flaherty were joined by original cast members Brian Stokes Mitchell (Coalhouse), Audra McDonald (Sarah), Peter Friedman (Tateh), Mark Jacoby (Father), Judy Kaye (Emma Goldman) and Steven Sutcliffe (Mother's Younger Brother).

International productions

Original West End production
Following its European premiere in a concert performance at the Cardiff International Festival of Musical Theatre in 2002 (which was later telecast on BBC Four), the musical was produced in the West End, London, by Sonia Friedman at the Piccadilly Theatre for a Limited Run from 19 March 2003 - 14 June 2003. This production starred Maria Friedman in the role of Mother, for which she won the 2004 Olivier Award for Best Actress in a Musical.

Original Norwegian production
The musical theatre company BærMuDa premiered the first Scandinavian production on January 18, 2018, coincidentally on the day of the musical's twentieth anniversary of the first night on Broadway. It was also the first time the musical was performed in a foreign language. The production was directed by Renate Stridh, and the cast featured Mimmi Tamba (Sarah), Marvin Charles Cummings (Coalhouse Walker Jr.), Kristin Rinde (Mother), Christian Ranke (Tateh), Kristian Grønvold (Younger Brother), Lars Arne Rinde (Father), Henrik Rinde Sunde (The Little Boy), Marianne Snekkestad/Cecilie Due (Emma Goldman) and Trine Eide Schjølberg/Ida Rinde Sunde (Evelyn Nesbit). It was translated by Christian Ranke and Cecilie Due.

The production won the BroadwayWorld Regional Award for Best Musical. The scene design was inspired by the suitcases on display at the Ellis Island immigrant museum. The production used a scaled-down version of William D. Brohn's original orchestrations.

Melbourne, Australia production
The Production Company performed the musical at the Melbourne Arts Centre, from 2 to 10 November 2019. It was directed by Roger Hodgman.

Revivals

2009 Broadway revival 

A new production opened at the John F. Kennedy Center for the Performing Arts, Washington, DC, on April 18, 2009, and ran through May 17, 2009, with direction and choreography by Marcia Milgrom Dodge.
The production then moved to Broadway at the Neil Simon Theatre, with previews beginning on October 23, 2009 and the show officially opened on November 15, 2009. The cast featured Stephanie Umoh (Sarah), Quentin Earl Darrington (Coalhouse Walker Jr.), Christiane Noll (Mother), Robert Petkoff (Tateh), Bobby Steggert (Younger Brother), Donna Migliaccio (Emma Goldman) and Ron Bohmer (Father).  This was the first Broadway revival of the musical and the first Broadway revival of any 1990s musical. The production opened to critical acclaim but closed on January 10, 2010 after 28 previews and 65 performances. This production had a large cast and orchestra, resulting in a significant weekly running cost that demanded the show be a popular success in order to prove financially worthwhile. "There had been rumors in recent weeks that the show would not be able to survive into early 2010; there was apparently not enough of an advance sale to encourage the producers." Despite the closing, the production received seven Tony Award nominations, including Best Revival of Musical, Best Direction, Best Actress in Musical, and Best Featured Actor in a Musical. One nomination, for Costume Design, was withdrawn on the basis that the designs were substantially similar to those of a prior production.

London revivals 

The Regent's Park Open Air Theatre played a revival of the musical from May 18 to September 8, 2012. This production was directed by Artistic Director Timothy Sheader. The cast featured Claudia Kariuki (Sarah), Rolan Bell (Coalhouse Walker Jr.), Rosalie Craig (Mother), John Marquez (Tateh), Harry Hepple (Younger Brother), Tamsin Carroll (Emma Goldman) and David Birrell (Father).

The Charing Cross Theatre played a revival of the musical from October 8 until December 10, 2016, and directed by Thom Southerland. The actor-musician production featured Earl Carpenter (Father), Anita Louise Combe (Mother), Jonathan Stewart (Younger Brother), Ako Mitchell (Coalhouse Walker Jr.), Jennifer Saayeng (Sarah) and Gary Tushaw (Tateh).

During the COVID-19 pandemic, Ragtime was at one point the only show in the UK to be playing to live audiences in a production presented by The Arts Educational Schools, London.  The musical played in the Andrew Lloyd Webber Foundation Theatre from March 23 to March 26, 2021. It was directed by Stephen Whitson and the cast featured Akmed Junior Khemalai (Coalhouse Walker Jr.), Beatrice Penny-Toure (Sarah), Lauren Jones (Mother), Jamie Chatterton (Father) and Benjamin Durham (Tateh).

Concerts 
Manhattan Concert Productions presented a one-night-only concert of the musical on February 18, 2013, at the Avery Fisher Hall at Lincoln Center, directed by Stafford Arima. The cast featured Lea Salonga (Mother), Patina Miller (Sarah), Norm Lewis (Coalhouse Walker Jr.), Tyne Daly (Emma Goldman), Kerry Butler (Evelyn Nesbitt), Howard McGillin (Father), Michael Arden (Younger Brother) and Manoel Felciano (Tateh).

A concert benefitting the Entertainment Community Fund (previously The Actors Fund) was scheduled for April 27, 2020, at the Minskoff Theatre. It will be directed by Stafford Arima and will feature many of the original Broadway cast, including Brian Stokes Mitchell as Coalhouse Walker Jr., Audra McDonald as Sarah, and Peter Friedman as Tateh. Kelli O'Hara will play the role of Mother in the concert staging. The concert will be dedicated to the memory of Marin Mazzie (the original Mother), who died in 2018. However, the concert was postponed indefinitely due to the COVID-19 pandemic, which also took the life of the musical's librettist Terrence McNally. It has been rescheduled for March 27, 2023.

Ragtime on Ellis Island 

A "developmental concert" of the musical was presented on Ellis Island on August 8, 2016. The concert is directed by Sammi Cannold, and featured Brian Stokes Mitchell as the narrator, Laura Michelle Kelly as Mother, Andy Mientus as Younger Brother, Brandon Victor Dixon as Coalhouse Walker Jr., Michael Park as Father, Shaina Taub as Emma Goldman, Aisha Jackson as Sarah, Robert Petkoff reprising his 2009 Broadway revival role of Tateh and Joe Harkins as Grandfather. An immersive, full production was anticipated in 2017, but did not occur. In March 2018, the team that was behind the developmental concert was to hold a sound workshop with sound designer Nick Tipp to explore the use of in-ear monitoring technology for audience members. This would mean that in a full production on Ellis Island, all the audio that the audience would normally hear through traditional sound systems would be live-mixed into wireless headphones worn by each audience member. The director Sammi Cannold told Broadway World that “While the workshop is of course focused on material from Ragtime, our team is also excited by the potential applications of this approach to other site-specific musicals in locations where it's impossible to use traditional sound systems.”

This production was also featured on an episode of the Working in the Theatre series run by the American Theatre Wing.

Regional productions 
2012 Shaw Festival

The Shaw Festival, Niagara-on-the-Lake, Ontario, presented Ragtime in 2012 in its Festival Theatre as part of its 51st season, from April 10 through October 14, 2012.  The production was directed by Shaw Festival Artistic Director Jackie Maxwell.  The role of Coalhouse Walker was played by Thom Allison, with Alana Hibbert as Sarah, Jay Turvey as Tateh, and Patty Jamieson as Mother.

2014 Westchester Broadway

Standing Ovation Studios presented Ragtime the Musical at the Westchester Broadway Theater from February 27 to May 4, 2014.

2017 Seattle

Seattle's 5th Avenue Theatre presented a new version of Ragtime in October 2017, based on a streamlined production from Theatre Latte Da in Minneapolis, directed by Peter Rothstein. It has a stripped-down cast of only 16 actors, whereby leading actors also portray the ensemble/chorus.

2018 Providence, Rhode Island

Providence's Trinity Repertory Company presented Ragtime in May 2018, directed by Curt Columbus, with Wilkie Ferguson III as Coalhouse Walker Jr. Mia Ellis as Sarah, Charlie Thurston as Tateh, and Rachael Warren as Mother.

2022 NYMT, London

National Youth Music Theatre presented Ragtime as part of its 2022 season in August 2022 at The MCT at Alleyn's in Dulwich, London. The production was directed by Hannah Chissick.

Synopsis

Act One

Three social castes in turn-of-the-century New York introduce themselves to the audience: the first is an upper-class white family from New Rochelle— the Little Boy, Edgar, and his Father (who runs a fireworks factory), Mother, Mother's Younger Brother, and Grandfather—who live a genteel life and enjoy a lack of racial and ethnic diversity; the second is the Black residents of Harlem, including a beautiful young woman named Sarah, who adores the pianist Coalhouse Walker Jr.; the third are immigrants from Europe in the Lower East Side, among them "Tateh", a Jewish artist from Latvia, and his young daughter. These three worlds are connected by narration from the luminaries J. P. Morgan, Henry Ford, Booker T. Washington, Emma Goldman, Harry Houdini, and Evelyn Nesbit (“Prologue—Ragtime”).

Mother bids goodbye to Father as he embarks on Robert Peary's expedition to the North Pole. He asks Mother to oversee his affairs and assures her that nothing will change in his absence, but Mother feels adrift without her husband to guide her (“Goodbye, My Love”).  As Peary's ship departs, Father watches as a "rag ship" arrives, carrying a hopeful Tateh and his Little Girl to America, while Mother, back on shore, wishes Father safe passage (“Journey On”). Meanwhile, Mother's Younger Brother, an intense and awkward young man yearning for purpose who works at Father's fireworks factory, attends the vaudeville act of Evelyn Nesbit, a young woman who became famous after her wealthy lover Stanford White was killed by her millionaire husband Harry K. Thaw (“Crime of the Century”).  After the show ends, Younger Brother confesses his love to Evelyn.  She kisses him, but only for the benefit of a press photographer, and cheerfully rejects him afterward.

Back at home in New Rochelle, Mother discovers a Black newborn partly buried alive in her garden.  The police arrive with Sarah, the baby's mother. Pitying her, Mother takes responsibility for Sarah and her child.  Surprised at herself, she remarks that her husband would never have allowed her to make such a decision (“What Kind of Woman”).

At Ellis Island, the immigrants arrive (“A Shtetl Iz Amereke”). Tateh eagerly begins his new life, drawing silhouettes and selling them on the street.  He and the Little Girl quickly descend into poverty.  Emma Goldman attempts to get him to join the Socialist movement, but he refuses.  A wealthy man even offers to purchase the Little Girl, whom he now keeps on a leash for safety.  Inspired by immigrant magician Harry Houdini, Tateh resolves to begin again somewhere else (“Success”).

In Harlem, Coalhouse, a popular pianist, informs his audience that he's finally found his lost love, Sarah, and is going to win her back (“His Name Was Coalhouse”/“Gettin' Ready Rag”).  He then purchases a Model T while Henry Ford and his workers glorify industry (“Henry Ford”).

Tateh and the Little Girl leave for Boston; en route, they meet Mother and Edgar while stopping in New Rochelle. They politely make conversation (“Nothing Like the City”). In the attic of Mother's home, Sarah explains her desperate actions in a song to her baby (“Your Daddy's Son”). Also en route to New Rochelle, Coalhouse is harassed by a racist fire squad led by chief Will Conklin, who taunt him for driving his own car. He arrives at Mother's house, where he has heard that a Black woman is living. He is stunned to learn of the baby's existence and, when Sarah refuses to see him, he resorts to returning weekly (“The Courtship”) until Mother invites him inside.  Grandfather asks Coalhouse to play a minstrel song on the parlor piano; instead, Coalhouse plays a ragtime song. Father returns home while Coalhouse is playing, and is stunned by the changes to his family's life, while Mother and her Younger Brother are proud of her choices. Eventually, Sarah comes down from the attic and reconciles with Coalhouse (“New Music”).  The two go on an idyllic picnic where, inspired by the words of Booker T. Washington, he dreams of a just, future America that their son will grow up in (“Wheels of a Dream”).

Taking refuge from a wintry night, Younger Brother enters a workers' hall.  There, Emma Goldman speaks passionately about a textile mills strike in Lawrence, Massachusetts, where Tateh and his daughter are among those targeted by federal troops and strikebreakers.  Younger Brother imagines Goldman is speaking directly to him (“The Night That Goldman Spoke at Union Square”).  Goldman is arrested, prompting a riot that mirrors the chaos in Lawrence, where Tateh is beaten by a policeman while trying to flee. He and the Little Girl escape Lawrence on a train; he gives his daughter a flip book of moving silhouettes to calm her. The train conductor offers to buy the book, and Tateh, hurriedly dubbing it a "movie-book", sells it for a dollar. Tateh realizes that "movie-books" may be a route out of poverty (“Gliding”).

Returning to New Rochelle, Coalhouse and Sarah are stopped by Will Conklin and the fire squad.  Conklin demands a fictitious toll; Coalhouse refuses.  A lecture by Booker T. Washington on patience and dignity ironically underscores the white firemen's destruction of Coalhouse's new Model T (“The Trashing of the Car”).  Incensed, Coalhouse vows legal action (“Justice”), postponing his marriage to Sarah until he gets justice. Sarah hears of a campaign rally nearby and goes to ask for help from the vice presidential candidate; as she approaches, an onlooker shouts "She's got a gun!" and Sarah is beaten to death by the Secret Service (“President”).  At her funeral, Black mourners demand an end to such injustice and pray for true equality. Mother, Father, Younger Brother, Tateh and Emma Goldman look on as Coalhouse weeps at Sarah's grave (“Till We Reach That Day”).

Act Two

The Little Boy wakes up screaming from a nightmare in which Harry Houdini attempts a daring escape after being locked in a dynamite-laden box by Will Conklin ("Harry Houdini, Master Escapist").  This dream proves prophetic: news arrives that a volunteer firehouse has been bombed.  Coalhouse has vowed to get justice on his own terms (“Coalhouse's Soliloquy”) and now terrorizes New Rochelle while demanding his car be restored to him and that Will Conklin be delivered to him. Booker T. Washington condemns Coalhouse's actions (“Coalhouse Demands”).  In the chaos, Mother retains custody of Sarah and Coalhouse's baby. Father blames her for bringing this turmoil into their lives, but Younger Brother lambastes him for his blindness and storms out of the house.  Mother grows increasingly offended by her husband's ignorant outlook. Father, to distract Edgar from the unrest, takes his son to a baseball game, but feels alienated from the raucous, working-class crowd, and begins to realize that his genteel way of life is passing (“What a Game”).  Coalhouse's campaign continues (“Fire in the City”), and so Father decides to temporarily move the family to Atlantic City.

In Atlantic City, Evelyn Nesbit's career is on the downslide and Harry Houdini has become intrigued by the supernatural and the afterlife following the death of his mother (“Atlantic City”).  Edgar cryptically shouts "Warn the Duke!" to Houdini.  Mother encounters Tateh again, not recognizing him from their brief meeting months ago; now a wealthy filmmaker, he has re-invented himself as "the Baron Ashkenazy" and is directing a silent movie in Atlantic City (“Buffalo Nickel Photoplay, Inc.”). Edgar and the Little Girl soon become fast friends, prompting Mother and Tateh to become friends as well; eventually, Tateh reveals who he is, and they grow even closer (“Our Children”).

Back in Harlem, Younger Brother seeks out Coalhouse but is repeatedly turned away until Coalhouse is convinced that he can be trusted.  Coalhouse has banished music from his life but watches a carefree young couple ("Harlem Nightclub") and recalls meeting Sarah (“Sarah Brown Eyes”). Younger Brother meets with him but is inarticulate and nervous: his profound thoughts, narrated to the audience by Emma Goldman, stand in contrast to the only phrase he can muster: "I know how to blow things up." (“He Wanted to Say”). With Younger Brother's help, Coalhouse and his men take over J.P. Morgan's magnificent library in the heart of New York City, threatening to blow it up. Father is summoned to help reason with Coalhouse. Before he goes, he assures Mother that everything will soon return to the way it was, but Mother knows such hopes are naive (“Back to Before”).  Meeting with the police, Father devises a mediation strategy involving Booker T. Washington, whom Coalhouse allows to enter the library. Washington, invoking the violent legacy Coalhouse is leaving his son, works out a deal with Coalhouse.  Younger Brother is enraged at Coalhouse's abandonment of their cause (“Look What You've Done”).

Washington leaves and Father enters the library as a hostage. There, he finally realizes the profundity of society's troubles while seeing Coalhouse convince Younger Brother and his men that violence cannot solve injustice.  Coalhouse exhorts them to fight through the power of their words (“Make Them Hear You”).  Coalhouse's sacrifice and oratory convince Younger Brother and the men to leave while Father tells Coalhouse about his son.  Coalhouse thanks Father for his kindness.  Once he leaves the library, Coalhouse is shot dead by the police.

Edgar appears to introduce the Epilogue.  Younger Brother departs for Mexico to fight for Emiliano Zapata. Emma Goldman is arrested and deported. Booker T. Washington establishes the Tuskegee Institute, while Evelyn Nesbitt fades into obscurity. Harry Houdini realizes upon the assassination of Archduke Franz Ferdinand that Edgar's shout of "Warn the Duke!" was a true mystical experience. Father dies aboard the RMS Lusitania; after a year of mourning, Mother marries Tateh, adopts Coalhouse and Sarah's son, and moves to California. Tateh is struck by an idea for a film series centering on a diverse group of children banding together. The ghosts of Coalhouse and Sarah watch their son grow up (“Epilogue: Ragtime/Wheels of a Dream: Reprise”).

Songs

 Act I
 Prologue: Ragtime – Company
 "Goodbye, My Love" – Mother
 "Journey On" – Father, Tateh, and Mother
 "The Crime of the Century" ‡ – Evelyn Nesbit, Younger Brother, Judge, Foreman, Ensemble
 "What Kind of Woman" – Mother
 "A Shtetl iz Amereke" – Ensemble
 "Success" – Tateh, J.P. Morgan, Harry Houdini, Emma Goldman, Ensemble
 "His Name Was Coalhouse Walker" – Coalhouse, Ensemble
 "Gettin' Ready Rag" – Coalhouse, Harlem Ensemble
 "Henry Ford" ‡ – Henry Ford, Coalhouse, Ensemble
 "Nothing Like the City" – Mother, Edgar, Tateh, Little Girl
 "Your Daddy's Son" – Sarah
 "The Courtship" – Coalhouse, Mother, and Company
 "New Music" – Father, Mother, Younger Brother, Coalhouse, Sarah, and Company
 "Wheels of a Dream" – Coalhouse and Sarah
 "The Night That Goldman Spoke at Union Square" ‡ – Younger Brother, Emma Goldman, Ensemble
 "Gliding" – Tateh
 "The Trashing of the Car" – Will, Firefighters, and Orchestra
 "Justice" ‡ – Coalhouse and Company
 "President"‡ – Sarah
 "Till We Reach That Day" – Sarah's Friend, Coalhouse, Emma Goldman, Mother, Younger Brother, Tateh, Company

 Act II
 Entr'acte – Orchestra
 "Harry Houdini, Master Escapist" ≠ – Harry Houdini and Edgar
 "Coalhouse's Soliloquy" – Coalhouse
 "Coalhouse Demands"‡ – Coalhouse, Booker T. Washington, Will Conklin, Newsboys, Reporters, Ensemble
 "What a Game" – Father, Edgar, and Men
 "Fire in the City" – Booker T. Washington, Orchestra
 "New Music (Reprise)" – Father
 "Atlantic City" ‡ – Evelyn Nesbit, Harry Houdini, Father, Mother, and Company
 "Buffalo Nickel Photoplay, Inc." – Tateh
 "Our Children" – Mother and Tateh
 "Harlem Nightclub" – Orchestra
 "Sarah Brown Eyes" – Coalhouse and Sarah
 "He Wanted to Say" ‡ – Younger Brother, Emma Goldman, Coalhouse, and Coalhouse's Gang
 "Back to Before" – Mother
 "Look What You've Done" – Booker T. Washington, Coalhouse, and Company
 "Make Them Hear You" – Coalhouse
 Epilogue: Ragtime / "Wheels of a Dream" (reprise) – Coalhouse, Sarah, Company

‡ - shortened in the 2009 Broadway revival

≠ - excised from the 2009 Broadway revival

Instrumentation
The Tony Award-winning orchestration of Ragtime by William David Brohn is for twenty-six musicians:

Reed I (Flute, Piccolo)
Reed II (English horn, Oboe)
Reed III (Clarinet, E-flat clarinet)
Reed IV (Bass clarinet, Clarinet, Flute, Soprano saxophone)
2 Horns in F
2 Trumpets in B (1st doubling Flugelhorn and Piccolo trumpet)
Trombone
Bass trombone
Tuba
Drums
Percussion
Keyboard 1, 2, 3
Banjo (doubling Acoustic guitar, Electric guitar, Mandolin)
Harp
Violin
Viola
Cello
Bass

In the original West End production, the fourth reed, bass trombone and harp parts were removed and the banjo player does not double on guitar or mandolin. The 2009 revival switched the doublings for the second and fourth woodwind parts. The fourth woodwind part in the original Broadway production had doublings for flute, bass clarinet, soprano sax, and alto sax.

Principal roles and casts

Original casts

Notable Replacements 
Broadway (1998-2000)
Father: John Dossett
Sarah: LaChanze
Tateh: John Rubinstein

Concert casts

Awards and nominations

Original Broadway production

Original London production

2009 Broadway revival

Adaptation
The show's original creative team of McNally, Ahrens, and Flaherty have created a "new symphonic arrangement" of the musical titled Ragtime: The Symphonic Concert. Its premiere is scheduled for July 2023 with Keith Lockhart leading the Boston Pops Orchestra at Tanglewood.

References

External links

 
 
Ragtime (Version 1 - Broadway) at the Music Theatre International website

1998 musicals
Broadway musicals
Musicals based on novels
Sung-through musicals
Plays about families
Plays about race and ethnicity
Plays set in New York City
Plays set in the 1900s
Plays set in the 1910s
Cultural depictions of American people
Cultural depictions of Booker T. Washington
Cultural depictions of Harry Houdini
Cultural depictions of Henry Ford
Musicals by Lynn Ahrens
Musicals by Stephen Flaherty
Musicals by Terrence McNally
Musicals inspired by real-life events
Tony Award-winning musicals